Banda Daud Shah is a town in the Khyber-Pakhtunkhwa province of Pakistan. It is located at 33°16'0N 71°10'60E and has an average elevation of 596 metres (1958 feet)

References

Populated places in Karak District
Karak District